Munjal is a surname. Notable people with the surname include:

 Brijmohan Lall Munjal
 Om Prakash Munjal, Indian businessman, poet, and philanthropist
 Pawan Munjal, Indian businessman
 Sunil Kant Munjal
 Aanchal Munjal, Indian actress
 Gowri Munjal, Indian actress and model